Father Fidel Maíz (March 8, 1828 in Arroyos y Esteros, Cordillera Department) was a priest in Paraguay.

Childhood and Youth 

Francisco Fidel Maíz was born from a legal and religious wedding between Juan Jose Maiz and Prudencia Acuña. Francisco Fidel Maíz, had 10 brothers, from which only were left 2 at the end of Paraguayan War. Fidel Maiz learned the first letters in the school of his town, Arroyos y Esteros, later on he moved to the capital city of Asunción, so as to enter the institute of the Argentine master José Joaquin Palacios.

He was lucky to coincide with the opening of the education, which followed the death of the dictator José Gaspar Rodríguez de Francia,  which was known to have been a dictator who closed all the  educational institutions of the country. He continued his studies at the Academia Literaria, under the supervision of the master Marco Antonio Maiz, his uncle.

First Steps 

His oldest brother was also a priest and was ordained a priest before him, and was in charge of the church of Lambaré and Valenzuela. Francisco Fidel Maiz, once ordained priest, was in charge of the church of Arroyos y Esteros, since 1856
In 1859  he leaves this responsibility due to a request of the President of the Republic, Carlos Antonio López, to take over the position of the first dean of the Councilor Seminar. In the Seminar, he teaches Moral Theology and Canonry. One of the most interesting characteristic of his personality is that, unlike many of his contemporary and others after him, he did not need to leave the country to reach a good intellectual formation as well as a very high level culture.

Even in the solitude of the time, and with  scarce cultural activities, Fidel Maiz had access to the principal thinkers of the time, some of them even opposite to the catholic, which gave strength to his thoughts. When Don Carlos Antonio López died, and once his son Francisco Solano López took over the presidency, the difficulties of Father Maiz and the new president began, because he had kept a very distant position, or at least not openly in favor to his designation.

So, also with the Obispo Palacios, Father Fidel Maiz, was sent to jail during four years, until a little before the Battle of Curupayty. Until then, Maiz had been a friend of Solano Lopez, but he did not reduce the repression of the opponents to the Father Maiz. After the Great WAR, and for a while  he was a prisoner in Brazil, at 42, the father Maiz had a lot to do and to say.

The father Fidel Maiz arrived to our country on December 5, 1870, after months of prison in Brazil. That same day, after getting off the boat and settling down, he went to the National Governor's house to greet the President of the Republic, Cirilo Antonio Rivarola. Maiz asked if from the new government, there were going to be any inconveniences to practice the priesthood, and the president Rivarola answered that yes, it was very important the participation of all Paraguayans in the re construction of the country.

So, after having arrived to Asuncion, father Fidel Maiz began working to re direct his life. He still had something else to do, the interview with the father Fideliz Maria de Avola, who had the title of Foreign Vicary, responsible for the church of Paraguay. This priest denied dealing with Maiz, putting as an excuse the order of the Delegate of Brazil and declared him suspended in his priesthood functions.

Trajectory 

Maíz received the communication on December 26: You are forbidden to make any sacrament as a priest. The next day, Maiz answered this prohibition with a very strong letter, and practically declared himself rebellious. When most of the churches were closed to Maiz, the presbytery Blas Duarte appeared, he was the priest of San Roque, who offered him to go with him to the pulpit in the mass of homage to the patron of Paraguay, San Blas.

Maiz doubted and after nine years of silence as a priest in the capital of the Republic, his voice sounded. The bishop Moreno, in the moment of this consecration, was very ill.

Like the rest of the members of the national cleric, Moreno was strongly opposite to a foreigner ruling the Paraguayan church, in fact, the article three of the new national constitution established that the chief of the church must be a native Paraguayan. Because of this, father Moreno chose a successor, through a document, to the father Maiz, until Rome spoke about it again.

On May 30, 1874, the bishop Moreno died; two days after Maiz sent the document to the minister of Cult, and six months later arrives to the bishop's office the notice of official acceptance of the document and the naming of him. When he returns from Rome, Maiz received the responsibility to direct the house of the Encarnación.  He remained there for some time, but with the possibility that his acts were badly interpreted, he requested his moving to his home town of Arroyos y Esteros. There he begins a long way during which he worked for his community creating among other things, a school for children of the zone.

He kept correspondence with some of the most important intellectuals of this time, such as Juan E O`Leary, and Ignacio A.Pane.

He was a great friend of Juan Sinforiano Bogarín, who went with him in his first tour  around the country as a chief of the Paraguayan Church.

In his writings, Maiz begins clearing his name as a Paraguayan citizen, and was compromised in a deathly war and did not doubt to defend his country. With a lot of tact, he takes care of remembering the beginning of the war, when he was a prisoner, so he did not have a chance to have any relation in the political, diplomatic, or military decisions adopted at that time by the Paraguayan Government.

"Torched by the situation of my country, and being the orders of my legitimate superior, I assumed the soldier's attitude without hurting my condition of priest, that with such a ministry, does not forget his natural condition of citizen.", he says in some of his writings. After putting emphasis in the extraordinary circumstances of a deathly war that forced them to take grave decisions, father Fidel Maiz rejects the responsibility of having had anything to do with the bloodshed, and requests a cleaning of his name and the canonic inability.

The letter is dated November 9, 1870. A little after this, the Empire put at the disposal of a group of prisoners, a transport to come back, and among them there was a priest.

Style 

Francisco Fidel Maiz, was different from all his contemporary and others who came after him, he did not need to go out of the country to reach an intellectual formation as well as a high culture. Even in his solitude during the dictatorship of Dr Gaspar Rodriguez de Francia, with the scarce development of cultural activities, he had access to the main thinkers of his time, intellectuals, some of them confronting the Catholic Church, which gave strength to his thoughts.

Close to the most relevant people of his time, he was a controversial priest and politician.

Works 

His book "Etapas de mi vida", where he tells the stories when the bullets were heard when Francisco Solano López took over the presidency, and he could not suppressed an exclamation "why are they sounding so many bells".

Bibliography 

 Enciclopedia Histórica del Paraguay.

1828 births
1920 deaths
Paraguayan activists
Paraguayan politicians
Paraguayan Roman Catholic priests